Shirley Ayorkor Botchwey (born 8 February 1963), is a Ghanaian politician who serves as Ghana's minister for foreign affairs and regional integration. She was appointed by Ghanaian president Nana Akufo-Addo as Minister of Foreign Affairs on 10 January 2017. She was a Member of Parliament for Anyaa-Sowutuom from 2013 to 2021. and had  served as Deputy Minister of Foreign Affairs and a Minister of State at the Ministry of Water Resources, Works and Housing under John Kufuor. She is a member of the New Patriotic Party.

Early life
Shirley Ayorkor Botchwey  was born in Accra on 8 February 1963. She had her secondary education at St. Mary's Girls' Senior High School at Korle-Gonno. She is a product of the University of Ghana Business School (UGBS), the Ghana Institute of Journalism (GIJ), Ghana Institute of Management and Public Administration (GIMPA), the Pitman's Central College, University of London and University of Westminster all in the United Kingdom (UK).

The Hon. Minister holds an Executive MBA, (Project Management option), MA in Public Communication, Bachelor of Laws Degree (LLB), a Diploma in Public Relations and Advertising as well as a certificate in Marketing Management.

Political life
In the last NPP administration under President John Agyekum Kufuor, Hon Ayorkor Botchwey served as Deputy Minister for the Foreign Affairs, Information, as well as the Trade and Industry ministries. She is a fourth term legislator and represented the most populous constituency in the country, Weija, for two terms until it was demarcated. She is currently serving a second term, representing the people of Anyaa/Sowutuom. She will not be running for re-election in the 2020 general and parliamentary elections.

At the party level, the Hon. Minister served as spokesperson on Foreign Affairs between the year 2009 and 2013.

During the same period, she was Ranking Member for the Parliamentary Select Committee on Foreign Affairs and subsequently, the Appointments, Defence and Interior Committees of Parliament

A member of the ECOWAS Parliament from 2013 – 2017, Hon. Shirley Ayorkor Botchwey worked with her colleagues to assist the Community Parliament in its advisory role in considering matters concerning the region particularly on issues relating to fundamental human rights and freedom, while making recommendations to institutions and organs of ECOWAS. The Hon Minister also served as Vice Chair on the NEPAD & APRM Committees.

Currently she sits on the Communication as well as the Gender and Children Committees of Parliament where she works with colleague members to look into matters relating to communications generally as well as examine all gender and children focused issues to ensure their inclusion in all appropriate legislation. on the list presented to parliament for approval on 21 January 2021, by the president of Ghana Nana Akuffo-Addo, Madam Shirley Ayorkor Botchwey was nominated as the minister for Foreign Affairs and Regional Integration.

Career
Before entering into frontline politics, Shirley ran a Marketing and Communications Company where she was a consultant for the Ministry of Tourism. She was also the managing director of Dynacom Limited.

As a practitioner of public administration, she worked with various organizations such as Worldspace Ghana, the Divestiture Implementation Committee, Glaxo Group Research and Hodge Recruitment.

Shirley is currently the Chairperson of ECOWAS Council of Ministers and the Minister for Foreign Affairs and Regional Integration of Ghana.

Personal life 
Shirley Ayorkor Botchwey is single with two children. She is a Christian who is an Anglican by denomination.

See also
List of foreign ministers in 2017
List of current foreign ministers

References

External links

1963 births
Living people
New Patriotic Party politicians
Foreign ministers of Ghana
Ghanaian Anglicans
Alumni of the University of Westminster
University of Ghana alumni
Cabinet Ministers of Ghana
21st-century Ghanaian politicians
21st-century Ghanaian women politicians
Female foreign ministers
Women government ministers of Ghana
Ghanaian women diplomats
St Mary's Senior High School (Ghana) alumni